Midhat Sarajčić (born 16 September 1971) is a Bosnian retired football player.

Club career
Born in Novi Travnik, he has played for local team Bratstvo Novi Travnik as well as for NK Zenica, Travnik and Čelik Zenica.

International career
Sarajčić made one senior appearance for Bosnia and Herzegovina, coming on as a substitute for Ervin Smajlagić in the 2001 LG Cup final against Iran.

Post-playing career
He was a member of the Executive Board of the Central Bosnia Canton Football Association for two terms, from 2008 to 2016. During the same period, he was a delegate in the Assembly of the Football Federation of Bosnia and Herzegovina. Since December 22, 2016, he has been a member of the Executive Board of the Football Federation.

At Travnik he worked as a sports director, director and president of the club.

References

External links

1971 births
Living people
People from Travnik
Association football central defenders
Bosnia and Herzegovina footballers
Bosnia and Herzegovina international footballers
NK Čelik Zenica players
NK Travnik players
Premier League of Bosnia and Herzegovina players
First League of the Federation of Bosnia and Herzegovina players